Sergey Vladimirovich Skolskiy (Russian: Серге́й Влади́мирович Ско́льский; born 6 October 1995) is a Russian powerlifter, Master of Sports of Russia, champion of Russia, four-time European champion in the open category., two-time world champion, record holder Guinness World Records.

Biography
Sergey Skolskiy was born in the Republic of Mari El in the city of Yoshkar-Ola, where he first got acquainted with sports at the age of 6. He started playing football at the Spartak children's club. I worked there until I was 13, after which decided to go to the track and Sport of athletics, after a couple of months of training I won the championship of the city of Yoshkar-Ola and the Republic of Mari El in the distance of 100 and 200 meters. After the unsuccessful Russian athletics championship, Sergey decided to give up this sport and try himself in cross-country skiing as he liked to ski. There was a gym in the section, where skiers carried out general physical training. As a 15-year-old boy, Sergey felt himself the strongest against the background of his colleagues, he was interested in working with iron. Gradually he began to immerse himself in sports literature and anatomy. For a day I read various articles and forums on the Internet. Realizing that it would be impossible to sit on 2 chairs, I decided to completely go to Powerlifting in order to achieve high results.
At the age of 17 he graduated from Secondary School №6 in his hometown in 2013, then moved to Saint Petersburg and entered a higher educational institution of Saint Petersburg State Institute of Technology in the period from 2013 to 2018, at the Department of Financier. In parallel with his studies, he devoted himself to training and competitions in powerlifting.
He is currently active in his social networks, consults people around the world and conducts seminars.

Education 

He graduated from secondary school №6 in his hometownin the city of Yoshkar-Ola in 2013, then moved to St. Petersburg, where he graduated higher educational institution Saint Petersburg State Institute of Technology from 2013 to 2018

Personal life 

Parents Skolskaya Irina Ilinichna (born March 09, 1969) and Skolskiy Vladimir Yaroslavovich (born November 21, 1970) are individual entrepreneurs.

The athlete is not married and has no children

Anthropometric data 

Height - 183 cm

Weight - 99 kg with 10% fat

Hand - 45 cm

Hip - 72 cm

Waist - 75 cm

Buttocks - 118 cm

Achievements 

Sergey Skolskiy participated in the following powerlifting contests

Performances in 2012 
Championship of Yoshkar-Ola:
 boys absolute, 1st place

championship of the Republic of Mari El:

 boys absolute, 1st place

Performances in 2013 
Russian championship:

 men up to 90 kg, 2st place

Championship of St. Petersburg:

 men up to 90 kg, 1st place

Performances in 2014 
Russian championship:

 men up to 90 kg, 1st place

Performances in 2017 
Championship of St. Petersburg and the Leningrad Region:
 men up to 100 kg, 1st place.

Open Cup Eastern Europe:

 men up to 100 kg, 1st place
 juniors up to 100 kg, absolute, 1st place

Performances in 2019 
Europe championship

 men up to 100 kg, 2st place
 juniors up to 100 kg, absolute, 2st place

European Cup

 men up to 90 kg, 1st place
 juniors up to 90 kg, absolute, 1st place

Eastern European Cup

men up to 90 kg, 1st place
 men up to 90 kg, absolute, 1st place

World Championship

men up to 90 kg, with doping control, 1st place
 men up to 90 kg, absolute with doping control, 1st place
men up to 90 kg Pro, 1st place
 men up to 90 kg, absolute Pro, 2st place

Personal results 
 Squat (exercise) — 355 кг.
 Bench press — 180 кг.
 Deadlift — 280 кг.
 The best result in the total eventing (powerlifting) - 885 kg (in juniors).
 World record holder among young men in squats with a barbell in equipment - 355 kg.

References

External links
 
 
 Sergey skolskiy on Vkontakte

1995 births
Living people
People from Yoshkar-Ola
Russian male weightlifters
Russian powerlifters
Sportspeople from Mari El